Van Acker a Dutch toponymic surname meaning "from (the) farmland". It is common in East Flanders and Zeelandic Flanders, while the agglutinated form Vanacker is more common in the province of West Flanders. Notable people with the surname include:

Van Acker / Vanacker
 Achille Van Acker (1898–1975), Belgian politician and Prime Minister of Belgium
  (1997–2017), Belgian racing cyclist
 Charles Van Acker (1912–1998), Belgian-American racecar driver
 Drew Van Acker (born 1986), American actor
 Evi Van Acker (born 1985), Belgian sailor
 Flori van Acker (1858–1940), Belgian painter, engraver, and stamp designer
  (1929–1992), Belgian politician, government minister, and mayor of Bruges
 Johannes Baptista van Acker (1794–1863), Flemish painter
 Luc van Acker (born 1961), Belgian musician, producer and label manager
 Regi Van Acker (born 1955), Belgian footballer and coach
 Thibaut Van Acker (born 1991), Belgian footballer
Van Ackere / Vanackere
 Maria van Ackere–Doolaeghe (1803–1884), Flemish writer
 Steven Vanackere (born 1964), Belgian politician, Deputy Prime Minister and Minister of Foreign Affairs

See also
 Acker, surname
 Laurens van den Acker (born 1965), Dutch automobile designer
 Van den Akker, surname of similar origin common in the Netherlands

References

Dutch-language surnames
Surnames of Belgian origin
Toponymic surnames